State Route 164 (SR 164) is a state highway in southern Clark County, Nevada. The route, along with the unnumbered Nipton Road located in California, connects U.S. Route 95 (US 95) in Nevada to Interstate 15 in California just south of Primm, via the small town of Nipton, California. The highway is also known as Joshua Tree Highway.

Route description

The highway treks east from there, curving slightly northeast to pass by the McCullough Range. At the northern tip of the mountains surrounding Crescent Peak, the highway turns slightly more southeast and decreases in elevation as it heads towards Searchlight, Nevada. SR 164 reaches its eastern terminus at the junction with US 95 in the center of Searchlight; however, the roadway continues east as Cottonwood Cove Road, entering the Lake Mead National Recreation Area and ending near Cottonwood Cove.

In 2003, a sign near Searchlight designated the route as the Joshua Tree Highway, due to the abundance of Joshua trees located along the roadway.

History
The highway connecting Searchlight to Nipton first appears on maps as a county road in 1933.  By 1940, the unimproved road was designated State Route 68.  The road had been graded by 1950 and was finally paved by 1963.

In 1976, the Nevada Department of Transportation began a project to renumber the state highway system. During this process, the road was reassigned to State Route 164; this change was first seen on official state highway maps in 1978. The route has been largely unchanged since.

Major intersections

See also

References

164
164
164
Transportation in Clark County, Nevada